Tapjeong Reservoir (탑정 저수지; also  탑정호, Tapjeongho) is a reservoir that has been classified as the second great scenic location in Nonsan, South Korea by the municipality.  It is located in Mujeok-myeon, Gayagok-myeon, and Yangchon-myeon in Nonsan City, outside of the city proper. Freshwater fish such as carp, mandarin, and catfish are in the body of water.   Other significant fauna include cockscomb pearl mussels and golden  and red-bellied frogs. The water is used in part for irrigation of down-stream farms.  The dam was recently re-built.  There are a number of hotels and restaurants along the circumferential road where it is near the dam. Swimming is prohibited, though fishing is permitted and boating, including water-skiing, is seen on the lake.

History 
The reservoir was constructed during the years 1941-1944.

During the second decade of the twenty-first century, work was completed on the waterfront, including an "eco-park" with walkways over a part of the reservoir and introduced aquatic and terrestrial plants.

During the drought of 2012,  the lowered water level in the reservoir killed more than two thousand of the rare large mussels.

Statistics 
Watershed area: 21,880 ha

Storage capacity: 31 611,000 m3

Irrigation area: 5,117 ha

References 

 www.docstoc.com/docs/42886769/POSTER-PRESENTATION

Lakes of South Korea